Neville Langrell "Bill" Barlee (October 15, 1932 – June 14, 2012) was a Canadian politician who was first elected to the Legislative Assembly of British Columbia as a New Democrat in 1988. He served as Minister of Agriculture, Fisheries and Food from 1991 until 1993 and then as Minister of Small Business, Tourism and Culture from 1993 until 1996.

Barlee was also well known for his popular TV show on the history of Canada West which he co-hosted with Mike Roberts.  This award-winning television series Gold Trails and Ghost Towns, ran from 1986 to 1996 on five different networks nationwide.  The show is still seen in reruns.

Work
He had a varied career as a high school teacher, writer, publisher, and placer miner. He left teaching to write, publish and become a small businessman.  His history magazine "Canada West" had faithful subscribers and his books included two best-sellers:  "Gold Creeks and Ghost Towns" and the "Guide to Goldpanning". Over his life, he and his wife carefully amassed an impressive collection of Old West artifacts. Parts of the Barlee collection were placed on display in the Canadian Museum of Civilization in Ottawa as well as museums in British Columbia.

In 1988 Barlee was elected as an NDP MLA. When the NDP became government, he was appointed Minister of Agriculture, Fisheries and Food. During his time as Agriculture Minister, Barlee conceived of, and implemented the successful "Buy BC" program, to support BC farmers. The Buy BC logo can now be found on virtually all food products made or grown in B.C. He also served as Minister of Small Business, Tourism and Culture. Vancouver Sun columnist Denny Boyd credited Barlee as being one of the best Tourism Ministers B.C. has ever had.

Awards and honours 
Barlee received a number of honours during his career including the "Golden Door" award from the BC and Yukon Hotel Association; the "Stellar Award" by the BC Restaurants and Food Services Association; and the "Visionary Award" from the BC Council of Tourism Associations.
Barlee was also awarded the Queen's Golden Jubilee Medal in 2002.

Election results 

|-

|-

|-

|-

|- style="background:white;"
! style="text-align:right;" colspan="3"|Total Valid Votes
!align="right"| 29,868
!align="right"|100.00
|- style="background:white;"
! style="text-align:right;" colspan="3"|Total rejected ballots
!align="right"|    87
!align="right"|
|}

Works

 Barlee N.L. 1976 Historic Treasures and Lost Mines of British Columbia. Canada West Publications.
 Barlee, N.L. The Pictograph Country: Similkameen. S.l., 1966. Re-released as Similkameen: The Pictograph Country, self-published chapbook, 1978. Re-released as Similkameen: The Pictograph Country (Surrey: Hancock, 1989).
 Barlee, N.L. The Prospectors' and Collectors' Guide: Covering the Okanagan, Shuswap, Similkameen Boundary, South Thompson Areas. (n.d.)
 Barlee, N.L. South Okanagan: The Sagebrush Country (Canada West, n.d.).
 Barlee, N.L. Gold Creeks and Ghost Towns: East Kootenay, Boundary, West Kootenay, Okanagan and Similkameen (Canada West Magazine, 1970?; Canada West Publications, 1980; Hancock House, 1984).
 Barlee, N.L. The Guide to Gold Panning in British Columbia Gold Regions, Methods of Mining, etc (Summerland: N.L. Barlee, 1972, 1974; Summerland: Canada West, 1977; Victoria: Canada West Publications 1979, 1980; Blaine, WA: Big Country, 1984; Hancock House, 1993).
 Barlee, N.L. (editor). The Best of Canada West (Langley: Stagecoach Publishing, 1978).
 Barlee, N.L. West Kootenay: Ghost Town Country (Canada West Publications, 1984).
 Barlee, N.L.  Gold Creeks and Ghost Towns of Northeastern Washington (Barlee, 1988; Hancock House, 1999).
 Barlee, N.L. Lost Mines and Historic Treasures (Hancock House, 1993).

References

1932 births
2012 deaths
British Columbia New Democratic Party MLAs
20th-century Canadian historians
Canadian male non-fiction writers
Canadian schoolteachers
Canadian television personalities
Candidates in the 2000 Canadian federal election
Members of the Executive Council of British Columbia
People from the Regional District of Kootenay Boundary
Writers from British Columbia
Liberal Party of Canada candidates for the Canadian House of Commons